Dictyneis is a genus of leaf beetles in the subfamily Eumolpinae. It is endemic to Chile. It is apterous.

Taxonomy
The original type species designated for Dictyneis was Myochrous pulvinosus Blanchard, 1851. This species was moved to Glyptoscelis by Jerez and Berti (1987), which would automatically make Dictyneis a synonym of Glyptoscelis. However, Jerez (1991) then designated Myochrous asperatus Blanchard, 1851 as the type species, which is considered invalid by Elgueta, Daccordi & Zoia (2017). Despite this, Dictyneis continues to be used, as it is intended that a submission to the ICZN will be made to preserve the name.

Species
 Dictyneis asperatus (Blanchard, 1851)
 Dictyneis brevispinus Jerez, 1991
 Dictyneis campanensis Jerez, 1991
 Dictyneis canaliculatus Jacoby, 1900
 Dictyneis conspurcatus (Blanchard, 1851)
 Dictyneis humilis (Blanchard, 1851)
 Dictyneis parvus Jerez, 1991
 Dictyneis quadridentatus (Philippi & Philippi, 1864)
 Dictyneis terrosus (Philippi & Philippi, 1864)

References

Eumolpinae
Chrysomelidae genera
Beetles of South America
Arthropods of Chile
Taxa named by Joseph Sugar Baly
Endemic fauna of Chile